The 12th Indian Division was formed in March 1915 from units of the British Indian Army. It formed part of the Tigris Corps, for service during the Mesopotamia Campaign of World War I. The Division arrived in Mesopotamia in April 1915 and remained there until it was broken up in March 1916.
The Division's brigades remained in Mesopotamia as independent formations until forming part of the 15th Indian Division in May 1916.
During its short existence it fought in a number of actions including the Battle of Shaiba between April 12–14, 1915, the  Battle of Khafajiya between May 14–16, 1915, the Battle of Nasiriya between July 5, 13-14, 24 1915, where 400 British and Indian soldiers were killed in the battle and up to 2,000 Turkish Soldiers. The Occupation of Nasiriya and the affair at Butanuja, January 14, 1916.

Order of battle
The division included the following units; not all of them served at the same time:

12th Indian Brigade
 2nd Battalion, Queen's Own (Royal West Kent Regiment) 
 90th Punjabis 
 44th Mherwara Infantry 
 4th Prince Albert Victor's Rajputs
 67th Punjabis 
 1/5th Battalion, Queen's (Royal West Surrey Regiment)

30th Indian Brigade
 24th Punjabis
 76th Punjabis
 126th Baluchis 
 2nd Battalion, 7th Gurkha Rifles 
 1/4th Battalion, Hampshire Regiment 
 half of 2nd Battalion, Queen's Own (Royal West Kent Regiment)
 half of 67th Punjabis

33rd Indian Brigade
The brigade was broken up in December 1915.  
 1/4th Battalion, Hampshire Regiment 
 11th Rajputs 
 66th Punjabis
 67th Punjabis
 4th Prince Albert Victor's Rajputs
 43rd Erinpura Regiment 
 20th Punjabis

34th Indian Brigade
Replaced 33rd Brigade when it was broken up. 
 1/5th Battalion, Queen's (Royal West Surrey Regiment) 
 31st Punjabis 
 1st Battalion, 112th Infantry 
 114th Mahrattas 
 half of 2nd Battalion, Queen's Own (Royal West Kent Regiment)

Divisional Cavalry
Two squadrons of 33rd Queen Victoria’s Own Light Cavalry

Divisional Artillery
86th Heavy Battery, Royal Garrison Artillery
104th Heavy Battery, Royal Garrison Artillery
1/5th Hampshire (Howitzer) Battery, Royal Field Artillery (Territorial Force)

Divisional Engineers
12th Field Company, 2nd Sappers and Miners
12th Division Signal Company

See also

 List of Indian divisions in World War I

References

Bibliography

External links
 

British Indian Army divisions
Indian World War I divisions
Military units and formations established in 1915
Military units and formations disestablished in 1916